Johann Adam (c. 1705 – 13 November 1779) was a German violist and composer of the Baroque era.

Life
Little is known about Johann Adam's early years and his birth year is an estimate. In 1733, he was listed as a Jagdpfeiffer at the Royal court in Dresden. In 1737 he was transferred to the Hofkapelle as a violist with a yearly salary of 400 thaler. From around 1740, he was also well known as a composer of ballet music which was played during operas, particularly those of Hasse, and from 1763 to 1769, he was employed as the director and composer of the Elector's French Theater. In 1775, Charles Burney said of him: "Mr. Adam, a veteran musicien, one of the few remaining performers in the celebrated opera-band, under the direction of Signor Hasse, has established himself a great reputation by his composition of the music to the dances performed at this opera in its most flourishing state".

Works
Many of Adam's compositions have been lost. Below is a list of his known works which are listed in RISM. As well as these, there are several movements of ballet music inserted into operas which also survive.

Oboe Concerto in B-flat major
Oboe Concerto in G major (also attributed to Bernasconi as a Flute Concerto)
Flute Concerto in D major
Flute Concerto in G major (previously attributed to Quantz as QV5: Anh.22)
Harpsichord Concerto in F major
Concerto for 2 flutes in G major
Concerto for 2 flutes in C major
Sinfonia in G major for strings (without violas) and continuo
Sinfonia in D major for strings and continuo
Sinfonia in F major for strings and continuo (also attributed to Giovanni Battista Sammartini as JenS D36]] ; also in a version for strings, 2 flutes, 2 horns, 2 bassoons and continuo
Jagd Sinfonia in D major for strings,2 horns and continuo
Sinfonia in D major for strings, 2 horns, bassoon and continuo
Partita in B-flat major for strings (without violas), 2 oboes and continuo
Partita in E-flat major for strings, 2 oboes and continuo
Sonata for 2 flutes in G major
Ballet Music La Tempête (only flute parts surviving)
Sacred Cantata Wie lieblich sind deine Wohnungen (composed 1735 or before)
Polonaise Fackel-Tanz for 2 oboes, 2 horns, 2 violins and continuo
Recueil d'airs à danser execute's sur le Théâtre du Roi à Dresde accommode's pour le clavecin (Published Leipzig: Johann Gottlob Immanuel Breitkopf, 1756)

Among his missing works are a Flute Concerto in C major, 3 Oboe Concertos, a Minuet from 1769, a Sinfonia in F major,  a Bassoon Concerto, and a Trio for violin or flute and harp.

References

External links

1700s births
1779 deaths
German Baroque composers
Year of birth uncertain